Adrián Mouriño Fernández (born 1 February 1988) is a Spanish professional footballer who plays as a midfielder.

Club career
Mouriño was born in O Porriño, Province of Pontevedra. A product of RC Celta de Vigo's youth system, he played two full seasons with the B team in the Segunda División B, subsequently moving to amateur football with neighbouring Coruxo FC.

Mouriño returned to the third division for the 2010–11 campaign, joining Montañeros CF. He featured rarely over the course of his only season, returning to Tercera División after signing with CD Ourense.

On 10 July 2012, Mouriño joined Segunda División club Recreativo de Huelva. He made his debut as a professional on 26 October, playing 80 minutes as a substitute in a 3–2 away win against FC Barcelona B.

On 4 September 2013, Mouriño signed with third-tier UE Sant Andreu. He returned to his native Galicia the following year, agreeing to a two-year contract at Pontevedra CF in the same league.

References

External links

1988 births
Living people
Spanish footballers
Footballers from O Porriño
Association football midfielders
Segunda División players
Segunda División B players
Tercera División players
Divisiones Regionales de Fútbol players
Celta de Vigo B players
Coruxo FC players
CD Ourense footballers
Atlético Onubense players
Recreativo de Huelva players
UE Sant Andreu footballers
Pontevedra CF footballers